Michele Bugliesi (born in Udine in 1962) is Full Professor in Computer Science in the Ca' Foscari University of Venice. He has been elected Rector of this University for the mandate 2014-2015 to 2019-2020.

Scientific activity
Michele Bugliesi works on analysis and formal systems in informatics, with publications on models of communications and logic programming.

References

Living people
Date of birth missing (living people)
1962 births
People from Udine
Academic staff of the Ca' Foscari University of Venice
Italian computer scientists